Atlas Maritime is an international shipping company with a fleet of tanker vessels engaged in the worldwide transportation of crude oil and refined oil products.

Atlas Bulk Ltd. manages dry bulk vessels, that transport iron ore, grains and coal.

Management
Leon Patitsas has served as the chief executive officer of Atlas Maritime, since he founded the company in 2004. Leon Patitsas built the company from ground up, and bought, operated and sold dry bulk carriers, gas carriers and oil tankers.  Patitsas had over 15 years of experience in shipping and prior to heading Atlas, he gained experience in sale and purchase, chartering and corporate finance positions. In the 1990s Leon worked for a bank in New York as a member of the team that invested in hedge funds. Patitsas has a Master of Science from MIT (Massachusetts Institute of Technology) and a BSc. in mechanical engineering from Tufts University. He is the VP of the committee of Skuld P&I Club (Norwegian Insurance organization).

Fleet

Atlas Maritime currently manages a fleet of tankers and bulkers. 

In October 2022 orders were revealed for two new aframax crude oil carriers (LR2 tankers) from DH Shipbuilding (formerly Daehan Shipbuilding). The tankers are expected to join the fleet in 2025.

History

Atlas Maritime draws on the long history of the Lemos family, a prominent Greek ship-owning family which has been involved in shipping since the 18th century. From 1860 to 1914 the family owned 52 vessels. Whilst their first vessels were general cargo, the family expanded their interests over the years into bulk carriers and tankers.

Throughout the 20th century, the family continued to charter, sell, and purchase vessels of various types. In the two centuries of its operation, the Patitsas-Lemos family has managed over 100 ships developing a wide network of industry contacts.

In 1905 Christos M. Lemos purchased, together with other prominent Oinoussian families, the family's first steamer; the 2,339 gross ton “Marietta Ralli”. Christos M. Lemos, who also became the first captain of the steamer, continued to build the fleet through the purchases of s/s “Triaina” and s/s “Efploia”.

His sons, including Captain Leon Lemos, further expanded the shipping business by co-founding the London-based company “Lemos & Pateras” in 1937. In recognition of their contribution in World War II and as compensation for the losses they suffered, the family, in 1947, bought the “Hellas”, one of the hundred newly available Liberty ships. Captain Leon Lemos became a prominent Greek shipowner in the 1970s and 1980s, building up a fleet of 17 vessels.

Captain Leon Lemos was the father of Mrs. Marigo Patitsas-Lemos, and the grandfather of Leon and Philemon Patitsas. Their father Spyros Patitsas entered the family business in 1968.

External links
 Atlas Maritime official website

References 

Tanker shipping companies
Shipping companies of Greece
Companies based in Athens